The 1997 Penn State Nittany Lions football team represented the Pennsylvania State University in the 1997 Big Ten Conference football season. The team was coached by Joe Paterno and played its home games in Beaver Stadium in University Park, Pennsylvania.

Schedule

Roster

NFL Draft
Three Nittany Lions were drafted in the 1998 NFL Draft.

References

Penn State
Penn State Nittany Lions football seasons
Lambert-Meadowlands Trophy seasons
Penn State Nittany Lions football